Mahatma Gandhi Pravasi Suraksha Yojana is a special social security scheme which includes Pension and Life Insurance, introduced by  Ministry of Overseas Indian Affairs for the overseas Indian workers in possession of Emigration Check Required (ECR) passports.
It is a voluntary scheme designed to help workers to meet their three financial needs: saving for retirement, saving for their return and resettlement, and providing free life insurance offering coverage for death from natural causes.

References 

Indian diaspora
Government schemes in India
Social security in India
Modi administration initiatives